Balbir Prasad Chaudhary is a member of the 2nd Nepalese Constituent Assembly. He won the Bara–4 seat in CA assembly, 2013 from the Communist Party of Nepal (Unified Marxist–Leninist).

References

Communist Party of Nepal (Unified Marxist–Leninist) politicians
Living people
Year of birth missing (living people)
Members of the 2nd Nepalese Constituent Assembly